Jørgen Rydder (20 September 1923 – 23 June 1944) was a merchant and member of the Danish resistance executed by the German occupying power.

Biography 

Rydder was born in Års on 20 September 1923 to agent Alfred Rydder and wife Johanne Marie Jensen and baptized in Års church on the second Sunday of Advent the same year.

In 1937 Rydder was confirmed in Års church on the 19th Sunday after Trinity.

On 23 June 1944 Rydder and seven other members of the resistance were executed in Ryvangen and buried there the same day.

After his death 
The January 1945 issue of the resistance newspaper Frit Danmark (Free Denmark) reported on the execution of the eight resistance members including Rydder.

On 22 June 1945 the remains of Rydder were found in Ryvangen and the same day an inquest in the Department of Forensic Medicine of the university of Copenhagen showed that he died from four gunshot wounds in the chest. The remains of at least six of the others executed with him were likewise exhumed in Ryvangen and transferred to the Department of Forensic Medicine.

On 26 June 1945 Rydder as well as Børge Johannes Lauritsen, who was executed with him and like him born in Års, were buried in their home town.

A memorial stone for Rydder and 90 other resistance members also exhumed in Ryvangen and buried in their respective home towns were laid down in Ryvangen Memorial Park.

References 

1923 births
1944 deaths
Danish people executed by Nazi Germany
Danish people of World War II
Danish resistance members
Resistance members killed by Nazi Germany
People from Vesthimmerland Municipality